The Skopje Marathon is an annual marathon held in Skopje, North Macedonia. Marathon is held in October from 2020.

History 

The first marathon race in Skopje was organized in 1997. It only lasted for that year and the following year before folding, primarily for financial reasons. After a nine-year break, in 2007, the event was partially revived with a half marathon-only race, and then fully restored in 2008, when three races were run: marathon, half marathon, and a 5K humanitarian race. Erwan Fouéré, European Union Special Representative for the country, helped spark the revival.

Since 2009, the race has been a member race of the Association of International Marathons and Distance Races (AIMS).

In 2012, the Skopje Marathon became one of the most significant sporting events in the Republic of Macedonia, as more than 3,600 runners from more than 36 countries attended. That year, the marathon was in the list of Qualifying Marathon Races for the Olympic Games in London.

The 2013 Skopje Marathon featured a full marathon, a half marathon, and a 5K race, and took place on 12 May 2013.

The 2015 edition canceled due to the 2015 Macedonian protests.

The 2020 edition of the race was postponed to 2020.10.04 due to the COVID-19 pandemic in North Macedonia, with registrants also having the option of either running the race virtually or transferring their entry to another runner or 2021.

Past winners

References

External links 
 
  

Marathons in Europe
Athletics in North Macedonia
Recurring sporting events established in 1997
Annual events in North Macedonia
Annual sporting events
Sport in Skopje
Spring (season) events in North Macedonia